Stanley Amuzie (born 28 February 1996) is a Nigerian professional footballer who plays as a centre-back or left-back.

Club career
In August 2017, Amuzie moved on loan from Sampdoria to Lugano.

International career
Amuzie was selected by Nigeria national under-23 football team for their 35-man provisional squad for the 2016 Summer Olympics. He debuted for the senior Nigeria national football team in a 1–1 2017 Africa Cup of Nations qualification tie against Egypt on 25 March 2016.

Honours
Nigeria U23
 Olympic Bronze Medal: 2016

References

External links

NFT Profile

1996 births
Sportspeople from Lagos
Living people
Nigerian footballers
Nigerian expatriate footballers
Nigeria international footballers
Nigeria youth international footballers
Association football fullbacks
Parma Calcio 1913 players
S.C. Olhanense players
U.C. Sampdoria players
FC Lugano players
NK Aluminij players
FF Jaro players
Kokkolan Palloveikot players
Liga Portugal 2 players
Swiss Super League players
Slovenian PrvaLiga players
Ykkönen players
Footballers at the 2016 Summer Olympics
Olympic footballers of Nigeria
Medalists at the 2016 Summer Olympics
Olympic bronze medalists for Nigeria
Olympic medalists in football
Nigerian expatriate sportspeople in Italy
Nigerian expatriate sportspeople in Portugal
Nigerian expatriate sportspeople in Switzerland
Nigerian expatriate sportspeople in Slovenia
Nigerian expatriate sportspeople in Finland
Expatriate footballers in Italy
Expatriate footballers in Portugal
Expatriate footballers in Switzerland
Expatriate footballers in Slovenia
Expatriate footballers in Finland